Lo más sencillo es complicarlo todo (English: The Easiest Thing Is To Complicate Everything) is a 2018 Mexican film directed and written by Rene Bueno. The film stars Danna Paola, Alosian Vivancos, and Marjorie De Sousa.

Plot 
The story revolves around Renata (Danna Paola), who has lived in love with Leonardo (Alosian Vivancos), the best friend of her half brother several years older than her. Now that Renata is of age to have a relationship with him, the beautiful Susana (Marjorie de Sousa) appears in Leonardo's life to stand in her way. Determined to get the love of her eternal crush, Renata will have to develop a plan to separate the couple, complicating everything in this hilarious comedy.

Cast 
 Danna Paola as Renata
 Alosian Vivancos as Leonardo
 Marjorie de Sousa as Susana
 Daniela Wong as Valeria
 Fernando Sarfatti as Papa de Renata
 Danilo Carrera as Wedding boy

References

External links

2018 films
Mexican comedy films
2018 comedy films
2010s Mexican films